Oru Sankeerthanam Pole is a 1993 Malayalam novel written by Indian novelist and writer Perumbadavam Sreedharan. Set in the city of Saint Petersburg, it deals with the life of the Russian author Fyodor Dostoyevsky and his love affair with  Anna Grigoryevna Snitkina who would later become his wife. First published in September 1993 it broke Malayalam publishing records in 2005 by selling more than 100,000 copies in just 12 years after its initial publication. It won numerous awards, the most prestigious one being the 1996 Vayalar award. The book surpassed its 100th edition with more than 200,000 copies in about 24 years. As of March 2019, 108 editions of this novel have been published.
Excerpts from the novel are part of Malayalam school and college curricula.

Plot
The novel revolves around the life of Dostoyevsky from the time of his meeting with Anna till their union. Dostoyevsky had promised his editor Stellovsky that he would complete the novel The Gambler within a few months, but he had not yet written a single page. On the advice of a friend, he recruits a stenographer, Anna, to speed up the completion. Anna had great respect for the novelist. But he was nothing like she imagined. On the surface, Dostoyevsky was an alcoholic, gambler and epileptic who could evoke revulsion in anyone. But Anna slowly discovers deeper characteristics in his personality, which slowly progresses into the emotion of love.

The novel delves deep into the mind of Dostoyevsky and exposes its loneliness, weaknesses, pain and spiritual agony. His own emotions of being a gambler and alcoholic gets portrayed in his novel The Gambler. The string of failed relationships, poverty and diseases haunt him. The presence of Anna gives him great relief. In the end, he communicates his love to her. They decide to be together.

Writing
Perumbadavam Sreedharan, in his introduction to the book, thanks Anna's memoirs for giving inputs for the theme of the book. The details of the life and personality of Dostoyevsky were derived from his various novels and biographies.

Unlike other biographers of Dostoyevsky, Perumbadavam does not crucify him for his weaknesses and manias. In the introduction to the book in a reprint in 2006, he says that the agonies that life gave Dostoyevsky purified him into a saint. He argues that only a saint could have produced such great works as Crime and Punishment, The Idiot and The Brothers Karamazov. Dostoyevsky's epileptic seizures, gambling mania and alcoholism are not considered as mere weaknesses of his heart, but as symbols of creative agony and internal conflicts of a great writer.

Characters
 Fyodor Dostoyevsky - Russian author
 Anna Grigoryevna Snitkina - Dostoyevsky's stenographer
 Fedosya - Dostoyevsky's elderly maid
 Gregory Yakov - Old man who lends money for gambling
 Stellovsky - Cruel publisher of Dostoyevsky's books
 Alonkin - House owner
 Polina Suslova - Earlier lover of Dostoyevsky
 Pasha - Dostoyevsky's stepson
 Ivan - Young man who wishes to marry Anna
 Olkhin - Principle of stenography school

Publication
The book was first published in September, 1993. It sold more than 50,000 copies in the first six years and more than 100,000 copies in the first 12 years. The latter feat was celebrated at Thiruvananthapuram on August 3, 2005.

Translations
The novel was translated to English by A. J. Thomas as Like a Psalm. It has also been translated to Hindi and foreign language like Arabic.

Adaptation
It was adapted into a 2016 Indian film, titled In Return: Just a Book, by Shiny Benjamin with a screenplay by Paul Zacharia. It stars Russian actors Vladimir Postnikov as Dostoyevsky and Oksana Karmishina as his wife Anna respectively.

References

Malayalam novels
1993 novels
Novels set in 19th-century Russia
Novels set in the Russian Empire
Novels set in Saint Petersburg
Philosophical novels
1993 Indian novels
Works about Fyodor Dostoyevsky
Indian novels adapted into films